Pierre Trabaud (7 August 1922 – 26 February 2005) was a French film actor. He appeared in 30 films between 1945 and 1989.

Personal life
Trabaud met French actress Capucine on the set of Rendez-vous (1949). The two married a year later in 1950; however, the marriage ended only eight months later.

Selected filmography

 Le jugement dernier (1945) - Extra (uncredited)
 Ouvert pour cause d'inventaire (1946)
 Antoine and Antoinette (1947) - Riton
 La fleur de l'âge (1947)
 Manon (1949) - Petit rôle (uncredited)
 Rendezvous in July (1949) - Pierrot Rabut
 Lady Paname (1950) - Marcel Bosset - le frère de Caprice, mêlé au milieu (uncredited)
 Without Leaving an Address (1951) - Gaston
 Endless Horizons (1953) - Pierre Castel
 The Unfrocked One (1954) - Gérard Lacassagne
 Le petit nuage/La chasse au nuage/Le nuage atomique (1954) - Journalist (I)
 Les Chiffonniers d'Emmaüs (1955) - Para
 Ah ! Quelle équipe (1957) - Hubert Franier
 The Window to Luna Park (1957) - Righetto
 Le Désert de Pigalle (1958) - Janin
 Ce soir on tue (1959) - Larry Laine
 Normandie - Niémen (1960) - Le lieutenant Chardon
 War of the Buttons (1962) - School teacher
 Asterix the Gaul (1967) - Caius Bonus (voice)
 Asterix and Cleopatra (1968) - Le capitaine des pirates / Le capitaine égyptien (voice)
 Daisy Town (1971) - Joe Dalton (voice)
 Tarzoon: Shame of the Jungle (1975) - Le premier siamois (French version, voice)
 La Ballade des Dalton (1978) - Joe Dalton, le chef de la bande (voice)
 Lucky Luke (1983) - Joe Dalton (voice)
 Le Voleur de feuilles (1983) - André Marcel
 Round Midnight (1986) - Francis's Father
 Life and Nothing But (1989) - Eugene Dilatoire

References

External links

1922 births
2005 deaths
French male film actors
20th-century French male actors